Kevin Seeldraeyers (born 12 September 1986 in Boom Antwerp) is a Belgian retired professional road bicycle racer.

Career

In 2009, he won the young riders jersey in the Giro d'Italia with a 14th-place finish.

For the 2014 season, Seeldraeyers moved to the  team.

Seeldrayers ended his career at the end of 2015 after failing to find a new team.

Major results

2005
 2nd Overall Ronde de l'Isard
1st Young rider classification
1st Stage 2
2006
 1st  Overall Tour de la Province de Liège
 2nd Overall Tour des Pyrénées
 8th Overall Giro della Valle d'Aosta
1st Stage 2
2007
 5th Overall Tour de Georgia
2009
 4th Overall Tour of Austria
 7th Overall Paris–Nice
1st  Young rider classification
 10th Overall Giro d'Italia
1st  Young rider classification
2011
 9th Overall Volta a Catalunya
2013
 3rd Overall Tour of Austria
1st  Points classification
1st  Mountains classification
1st Stages 1 & 2
2014
 10th Overall Boucles de la Mayenne
2015
 10th Overall Tour du Maroc

Grand Tour general classification results timeline

References

External links

Belgian male cyclists
1986 births
Living people
People from Boom, Belgium
Cyclists from Antwerp Province